Securinega is a genus of plants in the family Phyllanthaceae, first described as a genus in 1789. As presently conceived, the genus is native to Madagascar and the Mascarene Islands in the Indian Ocean. In the past, it was considered to be much more widespread, thus explaining the long list of species formerly included. It is dioecious, with male and female flowers on separate plants.

Species
 Securinega antsingyensis Leandri - W Madagascar
 Securinega capuronii Leandri - W Madagascar
 Securinega durissima J.F.Gmel. - Madagascar, Mauritius, Réunion, Rodrigues Island
 Securinega perrieri Leandri - W Madagascar
 Securinega seyrigii Leandri - W Madagascar

Formerly included
moved to other genera (Actephila Andrachne Chascotheca Cleistanthus Flueggea Jablonskia Margaritaria Meineckia Neoroepera Savia Tetracoccus )

References

Medicinal plants
Phyllanthaceae genera
Phyllanthaceae
Dioecious plants